Ala al-Din Tekish (Persian: علاء الدين تكش; full name: Ala ad-Dunya wa ad-Din Abul Muzaffar Tekish ibn Il-Arslan) or Tekesh or Takesh was the Shah of Khwarazmian Empire from 1172 to 1200. He was the son of Il-Arslan. His rule was contested by his brother, Sultan Shah, who held a principality in Khorasan. Tekish inherited Sultan Shah's state after he died in 1193. In Turkic the name Tekish means he who strikes in battle.

In 1194 Tekish defeated the Seljuk sultan of Hamadan, Toghrul III, in an alliance with Caliph Al-Nasir, and conquered his territories. After the war, he broke with the Caliphate and was on the brink of a war with it until the Caliph accepted him as Sultan of Iran, Khorasan, and Turkestan in 1198.

He died of a peritonsillar abscess in 1200 and was succeeded by his son, Ala ad-Din Muhammad.

References

Sources
 

Year of birth unknown
1200 deaths
Deaths from peritonsillar abscess
13th-century Turkic people
Khwarezmid rulers
Anushtegin dynasty